Yosef Yitzchak Kazen (1954 – 1 December 1998), also known as Y.Y. Kazen, was an American Chabad-Lubavitch Hasidic rabbi. He is known for creating and running Chabad.org in 1988, before the World Wide Web existed.

Early life
Kazen was born in Cleveland, Ohio to Rabbi Zalman and Shula Kazen. After arriving in Brooklyn, New York from the Soviet Union, the Kazens moved to Cleveland after being encouraged to do so by the Lubavitcher Rebbe. As a child, Kazen went to the Cleveland Kaliver Yeshivah and the Hebrew Academy and studied after school with his father. He also studied in New York and Brazil. He attended high school at the Telshe ("Telz") Talmudic Academy in Cleveland and later attended the Central Lubavitch Yeshivah.

Chabad.org
In 1988, Kazen was inspired to create a website to aid in Chabad's outreach after discovering message boards on Fidonet.  He received the Lubavitcher Rebbe's approval and started working on Chabad.org on his home computer.  Kazen worked from his basement answering emails and later running the website. He was later given an office at Lubavitch Headquarters. 

Kazen answered emails as part of "Ask the Rabbi" since 1988, making it the longest running online "Ask the Rabbi" service. He also started to digitize Jewish texts and post them on Fidonet bulletin boards.

After taking programming classes, Kazen started to develop Chabad.org, which was launched on the World Wide Web in 1993. Kazen's outreach included organizing a Passover service on a boat near Antarctica, sending kosher recipes to Jews worldwide, making thousands of Jewish documents and texts available online and using the site to answer e-mails and frequently asked questions as part of "Ask the Rabbi".

Kazen was featured in the 24 Hours in Cyberspace photographic exhibition at the Smithsonian's National Museum of American History.

Even after being diagnosed with lymphoma in 1998, Kazen continued to answer e-mails and update Chabad.org using a laptop in the hospital. Kazen died on 1 December and was buried in the Lubavitch section of the Old Montefiore Cemetery in Queens, New York near the Lubavitcher Rebbe and the Frierdiker Rebbe.

As of 2013, 488,431 people worldwide are subscribed to Chabad.org's emails, the site has 25 "Ask the Rabbi" responders, 744,370 questions answered in the past decade, content from 1,890 authors, hundreds of kosher recipes and thousands of video and audio files.

Family
Kazen married Rochel. Together, they had six children: Raizy, Michoel, Shmuel, Choni, Peretz and Sarah.

References

Chabad-Lubavitch (Hasidic dynasty)
20th-century American rabbis
American Hasidic rabbis
Chabad-Lubavitch Hasidim
1998 deaths
People from Cleveland